Hajjiabad Darvish (also Romanized as Ḩājjīābād Darvīsh; also known as Ḩājjīābād, Ḩājīābād, and Haji Abad Japlogh) is a village in Khomeh Rural District, in the Central District of Aligudarz County, Lorestan Province, Iran. At the 2006 census, its population was 40, in 10 families.

References 

Towns and villages in Aligudarz County